Rigoberto Padilla Reyes (born 1 December 1985) is a Honduran footballer who plays for Olimpia.

Club career
Padilla started his career at Valencia but was subject of controversy since Valencia claimed he was sold to Olimpia by Hispano in 2009 while still on Valencia's books.

His brothers, Esdras and Eleazar Padilla, also played for Hispano. Padilla, alongside Esdras and Eleazar was transferred to Motagua in 2008. But the transfer was unsuccessful for Rigoberto Padilla and he stayed to play for Hispano. He then joined Olimpia before moving to Victoria for the 2011 Apertura.

He left Victoria and returned to Olimpia for the 2013 Clausura.

International career
Padilla was a part of the U-23 team that won the 2008 CONCACAF Men's Pre-Olympic Tournament and played at the 2008 Summer Olympics.

He made his senior debut for Honduras in a friendly against Colombia on 26 March 2008 and has earned a total of 3 caps, scoring no goals. He has represented his country 2009 CONCACAF Gold Cup, where he played his final international against the USA.

References

External links

1985 births
Living people
Sportspeople from Tegucigalpa
Association football midfielders
Honduran footballers
Honduras international footballers
Footballers at the 2008 Summer Olympics
2009 CONCACAF Gold Cup players
Olympic footballers of Honduras
Hispano players
C.D. Olimpia players
C.D. Victoria players
Juticalpa F.C. players
Lobos UPNFM players
Liga Nacional de Fútbol Profesional de Honduras players